The Sand Pebbles is a 1962 novel by American author Richard McKenna about a Yangtze River gunboat and its crew in 1926. It was the winner of the 1963 Harper Prize for fiction. The book was initially serialized in the Saturday Evening Post, and in January 1963 it was published by Harper & Row. In 1966 it was adapted into the movie of the same name starring Steve McQueen.

Background
Richard McKenna served aboard a Yangtze River gunboat in 1936 but set the novel a decade earlier, during the Nationalist Northern Expedition of 1925–1927, aboard the fictional USS San Pablo, a captured Spanish gunboat left over from the Spanish–American War. The phrase "sand pebble" is a pun on the boat's name; thus, the sailors who serve on her are the sand pebbles.

Plot
The novel describes a life of boredom and sudden battle action, but the chief conflict is between the traditional western ideas, which saw China in racist and imperialist terms, and emerging nationalism. The protagonist, Motor Machinist Mate First Class Jake Holman, the San Pablo's chief engineer, teaches his Chinese workers—he refuses to call them "coolies"—to master the ship's machinery by understanding it, not just "monkey see, monkey do". The ship is sent to save the China Light Mission from anti-foreign mobs, setting off a debate: "No man who favors the unequal treaties has the right to call himself a Christian!" Others reply "It is time for the Society for Propagation of the Gospel to step aside. It is time for the Society for Propagation of Cannonballs to bring them to their senses." After the crew burn and destroy a war junk, Holman takes a landing party to rescue the missionaries, including teacher Shirley Eckert whom Jake has met several times and come to love. Holman is pinned down and killed, but Miss Eckert is saved.

Reception and review
It was serialized in the Saturday Evening Post for the three issues from November 17, 1962 through December 1, 1962. The author completed it in May 1962, just in time to enter it in the 1963 Harper Prize Novel Contest. Not only was it picked over 544 other entries for the $10,000 first prize and accepted for publication by Harper & Row, but also it was chosen as the following January's Book-of-the-Month Club selection.

Editions
 Richard McKenna, The Sand Pebbles: A Novel (New York: Harper & Row, 1962).  Reprinted: Annapolis, Md.: Naval Institute Press, 2000. .

References

External links
 Website devoted exclusively to the film version of The Sand Pebbles
 

Fiction set in 1926
1962 American novels
American novels adapted into films
Harper & Row books
Novels first published in serial form
Novels set in China
Novels set in the 1920s
Riverine warfare
American war novels
Works originally published in The Saturday Evening Post

pt:The Sand Pebbles